Dennis Bay Historic District is a historic district which was listed on the National Register of Historic Places in 1981. It is located northeast of Cruz Bay off North Shore Rd., in Virgin Islands National Park. The plantation was claimed and cleared by 1728 to operate as a sugar cane plantation.

References

National Register of Historic Places in Virgin Islands National Park
Buildings and structures completed in 1728